Francis Beattie may refer to:
 Francis Beattie (British politician)
 Francis Beattie (Queensland politician)